Ernest Aleksandrovich Verbin (Russian: Эрнест Александрович Вербин; born 11 June 1934) is a Russian rower who represented the Soviet Union. He competed at the 1956 Summer Olympics in Melbourne with the men's eight where they were eliminated in the semi-final.

References

1934 births
Living people
Russian male rowers
Olympic rowers of the Soviet Union
Rowers at the 1956 Summer Olympics